Agustín Parpetti (1887 – death date unknown) was a Cuban first baseman in the Negro leagues and Cuban League between 1905 and 1923. 

A native of Havana, Cuba, Parpetti made his Negro leagues debut in 1908 with the Cuban Stars (West), and played with the club for five seasons. He went on to play for the Kansas City Monarchs in 1921, and the Bacharach Giants in 1923. Parpetti also played for several teams in the Cuban League including Almendares, Club Fé and Habana.

He is laid to rest in Cementerio Cristóbal Cólon, La Habana.

References

External links
 and Baseball-Reference Cuban and Black Baseball stats and Seamheads

1887 births
Date of birth missing
Year of death missing
Place of death missing
Almendares (baseball) players
Azul (baseball) players
Bacharach Giants players
Club Fé players
San Francisco Park players
Cuban Stars (East) players
Cuban Stars (West) players
Habana players
Kansas City Monarchs players
Marianao players
San Francisco (baseball) players
Baseball infielders